Saglivatnet is a lake on the border of Trøndelag and Nordland counties in Norway. The  lake lies on the border of the municipalities of Nærøysund (in Trøndelag county) and Bindal (in Nordland county). The water flows out to the north into the river Saglielva which flows into the Sørfjorden, an arm off the main Bindalsfjorden.

See also
 List of lakes in Norway
 Geography of Norway

References

Lakes of Trøndelag
Lakes of Nordland
Nærøysund
Nærøy
Bindal